Flippin School District is a school district in Marion County, Arkansas, United States.

References

External links
 

School districts in Arkansas